The Border and Migration Police is a law enforcement entity under the supervision of the Albanian State Police. It is tasked to oversee and control the transiting of goods and persons across the country's territory. The Border and Migration Police carries out enforcement measures to prevent the illegal border crossings of foreign nationals and nationals engaged in the illegal  trafficking of goods. It cooperates with other state police entities in effort to facilitate an efficient management of the borders that are safe and secure.

See also
Albanian Police
Royal Border Guard

References

Law enforcement in Albania